Marjorie Flack (October 22, 1897 - August 29, 1958) was an American artist and writer of children's picture books. She was born in Greenport, Long Island, New York in 1897. She was best known for The Story about Ping (1933), illustrated by Kurt Wiese, popularized by Captain Kangaroo, and for her stories of an insatiably curious Scottish terrier named Angus, who was actually her dog. Her first marriage was to artist Karl Larsson; she later married poet William Rose Benét.  

Her book Angus Lost was featured prominently in the film Ask the Dust (2006), starring Colin Farrell and Salma Hayek, in which Farrell's character teaches Hayek's character, a Mexican, to read English using Flack's book.

Flack's grandson, Tim Barnum, and his wife, Darlene Enix-Barnum, currently sponsor an annual creative writing award at Anne Arundel Community College. The Marjorie Flack Award for Fiction consists of a $250 prize for the best short story or children's storybook written by a current AACC student.

Bibliography
 The Story about Ping, illustrated by Kurt Wiese
 Ask Mr. Bear
 Angus and the Ducks (1930)
 Angus and the Cat (1931)
 Angus Lost (1932)
 The Country Bunny and the Little Gold Shoes (illustrator, 1939; with DuBose Heyward, writer)
 Walter, the Lazy Mouse
 Up In The Air, illustrated by Karl Larsson
 The Boats on the River, illustrated by Jay Hyde Barnum
 Wait for William
 Lucky little Lena (c1937, published by the Macmillan Company, 1940)
 Tim Tadpole and the Great Bullfrog
 Neighbors on the Hill
 The Restless Robin
 Angus and Wagtail Bess
 All around the town: The story of a boy in New York
 Humphrey: One Hundred Years Along the Wayside with a Box Turtle
 Angus and Topsy (first published in Great Britain in 1935)

Awards 
 Caldecott Honor, for Boats on the River, 1947

References

External links 
Marjorie on Ask Art
 

1897 births
1958 deaths
20th-century American writers
20th-century American women writers
People from Greenport, Suffolk County, New York
American children's writers
American women children's writers
Place of death missing
Writers from New York (state)